The Cornhusker States Games is the state games of Nebraska.  It is part of an organization of games from within the National Congress of State Games. The games were established in 1985.

Sports
 Adventure racing
 Aquatics (diving, open water swimming, swimming)
 Archery
 Arm wrestling
 Badminton
 Baseball
 Basketball
 BMX
 Bowling
 Chess
 Cornhole
 Craft axe throwing
 Curling
 Cycling
 Disc golf
 Electronic darts
 Esports
 Fencing
 Figure skating
 Fishing
 Foosball
 Footgolf
 Golf
 Gymnastics
 Hockey
 Horseshoes
 Jiu-jitsu
 Judo
 Karate
 Kart racing
 Miniature golf
 Nebraska State Fair (USA Powerlifting, Street Vault)
 Ninja Warrior Challenge
 Pickleball
 Pocket billiards
 Powerlifting
 Racquetball
 Road race
 Rowing
 Rugby
 Sailing
 Shooting sports
 Soccer
 Softball
 Super Retriever Series
 Table tennis
 Taekwondo
 Tennis
 Track and field
 Triathlon
 Volleyball
 Walking
 Wrestling

References

External links
 

Parasports organizations in the United States
1985 establishments in Nebraska
Multi-sport events in the United States
Recurring sporting events established in 1985
Sports in Nebraska